The Levi Rock Shelter, named for former property owner Malcolm Levi, is an archeological site west of Austin, Texas where Paleo-Indian Native American artifacts dating back 10,000 years or more have been discovered.

Located along Lick Creek, the site was discovered in the mid-1950s and is believed to be the 7th-oldest paleolithic site in the United States. Many artifacts have been uncovered there, including Clovis points, carved bone cylinders, scrapers, awls, needles, punches, and incised and painted pebbles. Many are now in the care of the University of Texas.

The site, and its adjoining creek, are believed by local activists to be threatened by nearby development. The shelter was added to the National Register of Historic Places in 1971.

External links

Clovis sites
Native American history of Texas
Pre-Columbian archaeological sites
Geography of Austin, Texas
History of Austin, Texas
National Register of Historic Places in Austin, Texas
Archaeological sites on the National Register of Historic Places in Texas
Rock shelters in the United States